This is a list of rural localities in the Samara Oblast. Samara Oblast is a federal subject of Russia (an oblast). Its administrative center is the city of Samara. From 1935 to 1991, it was known as Kuybyshev Oblast. As of the 2010 Census, the population of the oblast was 3,215,532.

Alexeyevsky District 
Rural localities in Alexeyevsky District:

 Alexeyevka
 Avangard

Bezenchuksky District 
Rural localities in Bezenchuksky District:

 Pokrovka

Bogatovsky District 
Rural localities in Bogatovsky District:

 Bogatoye

Bolshechernigovsky District 
Rural localities in Bolshechernigovsky District:

 Avgustovka
 Bolshaya Chernigovka
 Bolshaya Glushitsa

Borsky District, Samara Oblast 
Rural localities in Borsky District:

 Borskoye

Chelno-Vershinsky District 
Rural localities in Chelno-Vershinsky District:

 Chelno-Vershiny

Isaklinsky District 
Rural localities in Isaklinsky District:

 Isakly

Kamyshlinsky District 
Rural localities in Kamyshlinsky District:

 Kamyshla

Khvorostyansky District 
Rural localities in Khvorostyansky District:

 Khvorostyanka

Kinel-Cherkassky District 
Rural localities in Kinel-Cherkassky District:

 Kinel-Cherkassy

Klyavlinsky District 
Rural localities in Klyavlinsky District:

 Klyavlino

Koshkinsky District 
Rural localities in Koshkinsky District:

 Koshki

Krasnoarmeysky District 
Rural localities in Krasnoarmeysky District:

 Krasnoarmeyskoye

Krasnoyarsky District, Samara Oblast 
Rural localities in Krasnoyarsky District:

 Krasny Yar

Pestravsky District 
Rural localities in Pestravsky District:

 Pestravka

Privolzhsky District 
Rural localities in Privolzhsky District:

 Privolzhye

Sergiyevsky District 
Rural localities in Sergiyevsky District:

 Sergiyevsk

Shentalinsky District 
Rural localities in Shentalinsky District:

 Shentala

Shigonsky District 
Rural localities in Shigonsky District:

 Shigony
 Volzhsky Utyos

Yelkhovsky District 
Rural localities in Yelkhovsky District:

 Yelkhovka

See also
 
 Lists of rural localities in Russia

References

Samara Oblast